Johny Johny Yes Appa is a 2018 Indian Malayalam-language family comedy film directed by G. Marthandan, produced by Vaishak Rajan and written by Joji Thomas (debutant writer of Vellimoonga). It stars Kunchacko Boban and Anu Sithara. The film released with a mixed reports.

Plot 
The story is about Johnny who pretend to be a gentleman but is a thief who thrives on lies and betrayals. When he was young, he started off small by stealing a rupee from his father and blaming his brother, Peter for childhood mischief. His parents, Kurian and Gracy and neighbors consider him a virtuous youngster. He manages to expel his elder brother from the family and put blame on his younger brother, Philip for his own misdeeds. But Philip supports and trusts Peter. Johnny is in love with Jaisa the daughter of a wealthy businessman Chavaranplakal Jose who tries his best to keep them apart.

His life changes when a teenage boy, Adam enters his life while he was performing a stealth. Adam blackmails Johnny and starts living with his family. Adam reveals his back story where he was brought up in an orphanage. He falls in love with a teenage girl who insults him since he has no address. Then he sets on a mission to get an address for himself and meet his mother.

Cast

Music 
The film music was composed by Shaan Rahman.

Reception
filmibeat rated the film 3/5 and said "A film with comedy & emotions in the right proportions". Manorama Online stated that "The film about family and for families is a typical entertainer and is a fun watch". The Times of India rated the film 2.5/5 and stating that "not pack enough punch to offer the viewers an engaging experience".

References

External links
 

Indian comedy films
2010s Malayalam-language films
Films scored by Shaan Rahman